Germán Ezequiel Rivarola (born 18 April 1979) is an Argentine football coach and former player who played as either a left back or a midfielder. He is the current manager of Rosario Central's reserve team.

Career

Rivarola had a season in Spain with Sporting de Gijón in 2000-2001, before returning to Rosario Central.  In 2003, he played for Pachuca in Mexico, before returning once again to Rosario Central. In 2006, he joined Colón de Santa Fe.

Honours

External links

1979 births
Living people
Footballers from Córdoba, Argentina
Argentine footballers
Association football defenders
Argentine Primera División players
Segunda División players
Liga MX players
Rosario Central footballers
Sporting de Gijón players
C.F. Pachuca players
Club Atlético Colón footballers
Argentine expatriate footballers
Expatriate footballers in Mexico
Expatriate footballers in Spain
Argentina youth international footballers
Argentina under-20 international footballers
Argentine football managers
Rosario Central managers
Argentine expatriate sportspeople in Mexico
Argentine expatriate sportspeople in Spain